Karl-Friedrich Merten (15 August 1905 – 2 May 1993) commanded the U-boat  in Nazi Germany's Kriegsmarine during World War II. He received the Knight's Cross of the Iron Cross with Oak Leaves. Merten joined the Reichsmarine (navy of the Weimar Republic) in 1926. He served on the light cruisers Karlsruhe and Leipzig during the Spanish Civil War patrols.

At the outbreak of World War II, he was stationed on the battleship , participating in the Battle of Westerplatte and Battle of Hel. He transferred to the U-boat Arm in 1940, at first serving as a watch officer on  before taking command of U-68 in early 1941. Commanding U-68 on five war patrols, patrolling in the Atlantic Ocean, the Caribbean Sea and the Indian Ocean, he was awarded Knight's Cross of the Iron Cross on 13 June 1942 and the Oak Leaves to his Knight's Cross on 16 November 1942. On the second patrol, Merten helped rescue the crews of the auxiliary cruiser Atlantis and the refuelling ship Python, which had been sunk by the Royal Navy. In January 1943 Merten became the commander of the 26th U-boat Flotilla and in March 1943, Merten was given command of the 24th U-boat Flotilla. In February 1945, he was posted to the Führer Headquarters in Berlin. At the end of the war, he was taken prisoner of war by US forces and released again in late June 1945.

After the war, Merten worked in salvaging sunken ships in the Rhine river. In November 1948, Merten was arrested by the French and accused of allegedly wrongful sinking of the French tanker Frimaire in June 1942. He was acquitted and later worked in the shipbuilding industry. Merten, who had written his memoir and books on U-boat warfare, died of cancer on 2 May 1993 in Waldshut-Tiengen, Germany.

Early life and career
Merten was born on 15 August 1905 in Posen, in the Prussian Province of Posen in the German Empire, present-day Poznań, Poland. His father was Dr. jur. Karl-Friedrich Merten, who in 1910 became the mayor of Elbing, present day Elbląg. In 1934, he was forced out of office when he refused to join the Nazi Party. Merten had a sister and a brother, both died before he had turned seven. His younger brother Klaus, as a Feldwebel (staff sergeant) in a pioneer platoon, died in 1942 of wounds sustained on the Eastern Front. Aged thirteen, Merten joined the Königliches Preußisches Kadettenhaus (Royal Prussian Cadet House) in Köslin, present-day Koszalin, on 1 April 1918. Following World War I, the cadet house was transformed into a state-run boarding school. There, he attended the school from 1920–26 and graduated with his Abitur (university entry qualification) on 20 March 1926.

He joined the Reichsmarine on 1 April 1926 as a member of "Crew 26" (the incoming class of 1926). He underwent basic military training with the 5th company of the 2nd department of the standing ship division of the Baltic Sea on the Dänholm in Stralsund. Merten was then transferred to the training ship Niobe (12 July – 17 October 1926), attaining the rank of Seekadett (officer cadet) on 12 October 1926. Following a 17-month stay on board the cruiser Emden (18 October 1926 – 24 March 1928), he advanced in rank to Fähnrich zur See (midshipman) on 1 April 1928.

Merten sailed on Emdens first training cruise, which began on 14 November 1926 and started in Wilhelmshaven. The journey took him and her crew around Africa to Indonesia and the Cocos Islands where  was lost on 9 November 1914. There the crew held a commemoration on 15 March 1927. The journey then continued to Japan and  Alaska down the west coast of North and South America, around Cape Horn. They celebrated Christmas and New Year's Day in Rio de Janeiro. From there they headed to Middle America and the Azores. Their final stopover was Vilagarcía de Arousa, Spain before they returned home on 14 March 1928.

Following his journey on Emden, Merten attended the main cadet course at the Naval Academy at Mürwik (25 March 1928 – 22 March 1929). This course was briefly interrupted for two navigational training courses, the first on the tender Nordsee (9–13 July 1928) and the second on the survey vessel Meteor (8–13 October 1928). He then underwent a number of specialized training courses which included a torpedo course in Mürwik (23 March – 1 June 1929), a communication course for cadets at Mürwik again (2 June – 6 July 1929), a pathfinder course for cadets at Kiel (7 July – 4 August 1929), a naval infantry course for cadets with the 8th company of the 2nd battalion of the standing ship division at Stralsund (5 August – 27 October 1929), and lastly an artillery course for cadets at Kiel-Wik (28 October 1929 – 2 February 1930). On this assignment, he was promoted to Oberfähnrich zur See (Ensign) on 1 June 1930. His cadet mentor on Elsass and Schleswig-Holstein was Korvettenkapitän (Corvette Captain) Ernst Lindemann. Lindemann later commanded the battleship Bismarck. Merten's next service position was a gunnery officer on the light cruiser Königsberg (23 September 1930 – 23 September 1931). There he was made an officer, attaining the rank Leutnant zur See (acting sub-lieutenant) on 1 October 1930. His stay on Königsberg was briefly interrupted for a gas protection course (6–16 January 1931).

For two years, Merten then became gunnery instructor at the Naval Artillery School in Kiel-Wik (24 September 1931 – 29 September 1933). During this timeframe, Merten himself attended an anti-aircraft artillery course at Wilhelmshaven (16 February – 12 May 1932), and an anti-aircraft artillery instructors course in Wilhelmshaven and on the tender Fuchs (11 October – 14 December 1932). On 15 December 1932, Merten was posted to the gunnery training ship , serving as 2nd artillery officer. After this assignment, which ended on 25 March 1933, he was promoted to Oberleutnant zur See (lieutenant (junior grade)) on 1 April 1933. In 1933, Merten first met his future wife, Ruth Oldenburg from Wiesbaden. At the time, she was a first semester medicine student at the University of Kiel. On 15 March 1934, the marriage approval was granted by Naval Personnel Office. The two married on 21 April 1934 in Wiesbaden. The marriage resulted in the birth of a daughter, Karen-Helge, born on 11 June 1935, a son Karl-Friedrich Birger, born 15 March 1939, and another son, Jan, born February 1947.

For the next five months (30 September 1933 – 26 February 1934), Merten served as the artillery referent with the Commander of Minesweepers (F.d.M.). In parallel to this assignment, he served as 2nd watch officer on the torpedo boat T-156 in the 2nd Minesweeper-Demi-Flotilla as well as Flag Lieutenant with the Commander of Scouting Forces (B.d.A.) on the fleet tender Hella (6–29 January 1934). He then posted to the anti-artillery training course at the Naval Coast Artillery School in Wilhelmshaven (27 February – 28 March 1934). He then transferred back to his former position of 2nd watch officer on torpedo boat T-156 (29 March – 30 September 1934), this posting was briefly interrupted by a transfer to the light cruiser Königsberg (8 July – 2 August 1934).

Merten was posted to the light cruiser Karlsruhe (21 September 1935 – 7 March 1937), serving as the 2nd artillery officer and watch officer. On 1 April 1936, Merten was promoted to Kapitänleutnant (captain lieutenant) and on 2 October 1936 received the Wehrmacht Long Service Award 4th Class, which had been created on 16 March 1936, for four years of military service. In back-to-back assignments, he was briefly transferred to the light cruiser Leipzig (8 March – 20 May 1937), serving as the anti-aircraft artillery officer, and then again on Karlsruhe (21 May – 11 June 1937). On Karlsruhe and Leipzig he participated in the Kriegsmarines non-intervention patrols of the Spanish Civil War. For this service he received the Spanish Cross in Bronze on 20 April 1938. Merten led a Star sailing boat training course (21 July – 29 September 1937) and was then given command of the escort ship F-7 (30 September 1937 – 12 February 1939).

World War II
From 1 March to 30 June 1939, Merten took an artillery officer's training course for battleship and was posted to Schleswig-Holstein in July 1939 as a cadet training officer. World War II began on 1 September 1939 when German forces invaded Poland. Merten participated in the bombardment of the Polish base at Danzig's Westerplatte in the early morning hours of 1 September 1939. On 7 September, he led Schleswig-Holstein's naval infantry troops in the Battle of Hel. Together with the 5. Marineartillerie-Abteilung (5th Naval Artillery Department), German troops landed on the Hel Peninsula. For his actions in these battles he received the Iron Cross 2nd Class on 2 October 1939.

Merten volunteered for service with the U-boat arm in 1940. He attended his first U-boat training course with the torpedo school in Flensburg-Mürwik (29 April– 2 June 1940), followed by another course at the communications school, also in Flensburg-Mürwik (3–30 June 1940). He was then posted to the 1st U-boat Training Division (1 July – 29 September 1940), followed by a U-boat commander's course with the 24th U-boat Flotilla (30 September – 29 November 1940). On 30 November 1940, Merten was transferred to the 2nd U-boat Flotilla, joining the crew of Kapitänleutnant Heinrich Liebe's  as a commander in training and watch officer. Merten went on one war patrol with U-38 (18 December 1940 – 22 January 1941).

U-boat commander and first patrol
U-68 was a Type IXC U-boat, designed as a large ocean-going submarine for sustained operations far from the home support facilities. Merten commissioned U-68 on 11 February 1941 into the 2nd U-boat Flotilla. He took U-68 on five war patrols, patrolling in the Atlantic Ocean, the Caribbean Sea and the Indian Ocean. He surrendered command of U-68 on 18 January 1943 to Oberleutnant zur See Albert Lauzemis.

Merten's first patrol (30 June – 1 August 1941) was a transfer patrol into the northern Atlantic Ocean, taking U-68 from Kiel to Lorient in France. The patrol, taking U-68 into the North Atlantic, lasted 33 days and covered  afloat and  submerged. His 1st watch officer on this patrol was Oberleutnant zur See August Maus, 2nd watch officer was Lauzemis. Merten did not sink any ships on this patrol.

During the first five days of this patrol, U-68 came under a depth charge attack and was almost rammed by a Royal Navy destroyer south of Iceland. Merten later attempted to torpedo strangler and came into contact with a British convoy, which he lost again without shooting a single torpedo. When the main bilge pump failed, which impeded the U-boats diving ability, Merten decided to abort the mission and headed for France. On the journey to France, the starboard diesel engine failed and a member of the crew fell ill with pneumonia. U-68 arrived in Lorient on 1 August 1940.

Second patrol, rescue of Allied crews
On the second patrol (11 September – 25 December 1941), Merten headed for the middle and southern Atlantic Ocean, the Ascension Island, to Saint Helena and Cape Verde. The patrol, taking U-68 into the South Atlantic, lasted 116 days and covered  afloat and  submerged. During the course of this patrol, he was able to sink four ship totaling . On 22 September 1941, Merten torpedoed his first ship the  British Steamer  sailing in convoy SL-87. However  und the command of Kapitänleutnant Werner Winter was credited with these sinkings. Off Saint Helena, Merten sank the British fleet oiler Darkdale on 22 October 1941. On 28 October 1941, U-68 sank  and the British motor merchant  on 1 November 1941.

On 13 November 1941, U-68 was resupplied by the auxiliary cruiser Atlantis under the command of Kapitän zur See Bernhard Rogge. The next day, they met again and provisions were transferred to U-68. During the following night, U-68 conducted a number of mock attacks on Atlantis for training purposes. On 23 November, U-68 received the message that Atlantis had been sunk by  while resupplying  under the command of Kapitänleutnant Ernst Bauer. U-126 was able to rescue up 300 German sailors, including Rogge. Two days later the survivors were transferred to the refueling ship Python. On 30 November, U-68 and UA met with Python for refueling. Immediately Merten and the crew began taking on fuel,  were transferred, as well as replenishing spent torpedoes. UA was late to arrive, unnecessarily delaying the procedure. During the refueling, a smokestack was sighted, sounding the alarms. U-68 was not ready for combat, Merten and the crew had difficulties keeping the boat at depth. Holding the boat at periscope depth was impossible. Submerged, the crew of U-68 could hear the sinking of Python. Following the first warning salvo by Dorsetshire, Pythons crew its crew had chosen to scuttle the ship to avoid unnecessary casualties.

Third through fifth patrols
The patrol, taking U-68 to the West African coast, lasted 60 days and covered  afloat and  submerged.

On this patrol, he was awarded the Knight's Cross of the Iron Cross on 13 June 1942. The patrol lasted 56 days and covered  afloat and  submerged. U-68 sank the American steam tanker  and the Panamanian motor tanker , at the time the World's largest oil tanker, on 5 June 1942. On 15 June 1942, Merten sank the Free French  which had legal consequences for him after the war.

The patrol, taking U-68 to and around South Africa into the Indian Ocean, lasted 108 days and covered  afloat and  submerged.

The Cairo had been carrying 302 people, including 101 passengers, among them 29 women and 19 children (in addition to two stewardesses travelling as part of the crew). The ship sank in roughly 25 minutes, and when Merten sent the second torpedo slamming into the liner, it capsized a lifeboat and smashed another, leaving women and children struggling in the water. Merten approached Boat 6, asking for the name, tonnage, and cargo of the ship, famously ending the conversation by saying, "Goodnight, sorry for sinking you." He pointed the survivors in the direction of the nearest land, St. Helena, which was more than 500 miles away. Two lifeboats spent thirteen days at sea, another spent 14, one spent 36 and contained only three survivors, one spent 51 days and contained only 2 survivors. In the end, 107 of 302 people on board perished, including 4 of 31 women.

On this patrol, he was awarded the Knight's Cross of the Iron Cross with Oak Leaves on 16 November 1942, the 147th officer or soldier of the Wehrmacht so honored. On 30 January 1943, Dönitz awarded Merten the U-boat War Badge with Diamonds. The presentation was made at the Hotel Kaiserhof in Berlin by Großadmiral Erich Raeder after the Oak Leaves presentation in Rastenburg. On 31 January 1943, Merten, Dönitz and other Kriegsmarine officers traveled to the Wolf's Lair, Hitler's headquarters in Rastenburg, present-day Kętrzyn in Poland, for the Oak Leaves presentation. Following the presentation, Hitler met with Dönitz and Vizeadmiral Theodor Krancke in private. In this meeting, Hitler appointed Dönitz as Oberbefehlshaber der Marine (Commander-in-Chief) of the Kriegsmarine following Raeder's resignation on 30 January 1943. On the return flight to Berlin, Dönitz informed Merten and the other officers present of this change in command.

Ashore
After his fifth war patrol, Merten was transferred to the 26th U-boat Flotilla (19 January – 28 February 1943) in Pillau, serving as deputy flotilla chief. On 1 March 1943, he was given command of the 24th U-boat Flotilla.

During his tenure with the 24th U-boat Flotilla, Merten was in frequent conflict with the Gauleiter of East Prussia, Erich Koch. In July 1944, Koch had ordered 6,000 untrained Hitler Youth boys to man the defensive positions around Memel, present-day Klaipėda, Lithuania, against the advancing Red Army. Merten evacuated the youngsters over the sea. Großadmiral (Grand Admiral) Karl Dönitz helped mitigate the situation with the furious Koch. In August 1944, Merten further evacuated 50,000 civilians with his flotilla.

On 12 March 1945, the 24th U-boat Flotilla was disbanded and Merten was posted to the Führer Headquarters in Berlin as a liaison officer. There he was put on the staff of Generalleutnant Rudolf Hübner's Fliegendes Sondergericht West (Flying Special Court-Martial West). This unit was  created by Hitler in response to the American capture of the Ludendorff Bridge over the Rhine at Remagen. Although Merten joined this unit later, the Flying Special Court-Martial West was responsible for the death sentences of Major (Major) Hans Scheller, Major August Kraft and Major Herbert Strobel, as well as Hauptmann (Captain) Willi Oskar Bratge and Oberleutnant (First Lienutenant) Karl-Heinz Peters.

On 15 April 1945, he was promoted to Kapitän zur See (captain at sea). In late April 1945, Merten and other officers travelled to Upper Bavaria to the so-called Alpine Fortress. There, following the end of World War II in Europe, he was taken prisoner of war. From 25–29 June 1945, he was held in US captivity in Biessenhofen, Bavaria and released on 29 June 1945.

Later life
In October 1948, Merten, who at the time lived in Wiesbaden and worked for the Wasserstraßen-Direktion Rheinland-Pfalz (Waterways Directorate Rhineland-Palatinate) salvaging sunken ships, was arrested by the French and accused of allegedly wrongful sinking of the French tanker Frimaire in June 1942. From 6 October 1948 until 8 March 1949, he was held in custody at the Cherche-Midi prison in Paris. The same prison Hermann-Bernhard Ramcke was awaiting his trial. Merten was acquitted on 10 September 1949. The Frimaire, which belonged to the Vichy government, had not been properly marked. Merten, among others, attended Karl Dönitz's funeral on 6 January 1981.

On 14 September 1984, a reunion of the survivors of City of Cairo was celebrated aboard . The re-union was attended by 17 survivors and Merten and commemorated the publication of the book by Ralph Barker "Goodnight, Sorry for Sinking You".

In 1986, Merten and Kurt Baberg published their book Wir U-Bootfahrer sagen: "Nein!" "So war das nicht!" [We U-Boat Sailors say: "No!" "It was not like this!"]. This book criticizes Lothar-Günther Buchheim, especially his work Die U-Boot-Fahrer [U-Boat Sailors], for his anti-Dönitz demeanor.

On 1 January 1969, Merten started working for the Ingenieur Kontor Lübeck (IKL), headed by Ulrich Gabler, as a military-tactical advisor. He died of cancer on 2 May 1993 in Waldshut-Tiengen.

Awards
 Wehrmacht Long Service Award 4th Class & 3rd Class (2 October 1936)
 Spanish Cross in Bronze (20 April 1938)
 Sudetenland Medal (20 December 1939)
 Iron Cross (1939) 2nd Class (2 October 1939 & 1st Class (30 December 1941)
 U-boat War Badge (1939) (2 August 1941) & with Diamonds (30 January 1943)
 High Seas Fleet Badge (9 October 1942)
 Knight's Cross of the Iron Cross with Oak Leaves
 Knight's Cross on 13 June 1942 as Korvettenkapitän and commander of U-68
 Oak Leaves on 16 November 1942 as Korvettenkapitän and commander of U-68
 War Merit Cross 1st Class with Swords
 2nd Class (30 January 1944)
 1st Class (29 October 1944)

Translation notes

Notes

References

Citations

Bibliography

Further reading

 

1905 births
1993 deaths
Military personnel from Poznań
People from the Province of Posen
Reichsmarine personnel
U-boat commanders (Kriegsmarine)
German military personnel of the Spanish Civil War
Recipients of the Knight's Cross of the Iron Cross with Oak Leaves
German prisoners of war in World War II held by the United States
Deaths from cancer in Germany
Prisoners and detainees of France
German people imprisoned abroad